The 1939 Grand Prix season was the seventh AIACR European Championship season. The championship winner was never officially announced by the AIACR due to the outbreak of World War II less than two weeks after the final event in Switzerland. The Italian GP initially had been a fifth event, but it became clear well before the war that it would be cancelled due to construction work. At that time, it was also undecided which scoring system would be used, the old minimum points system that basically counted positions, or the French maximum points system similar to the modern one. Although Hermann Paul Müller would have won the championship on points according to the old system, the president of Nazi Germany's highest motorsports organisation declared Hermann Lang the champion. Lang was clearly the dominating driver in that season, which was acknowledged by the international press. In the first two of the four championship events, both Lang and Müller won once while the other failed to complete 75% of the distance. The German round saw Lang retiring early, and Müller finishing 2nd behind Caracciola. This left Müller in the lead in both scoring systems, as published in magazines, with the Swiss round deciding the outcome. Müller finished 4th behind three Mercedes, which gave him the lead in the old point system, while in front, Lang had beaten Caracciola for the lead in the maximum points system.

Teams and drivers
The following teams and drivers competed in the 1939 AIACR European Championship.

Season review

European Championship Grands Prix

Non-championship Grands Prix

Grandes Épreuves are denoted by a yellow background.

Unofficial championship standings

Notes

References
 
 
 

Grand Prix seasons